Milt is the seminal fluid of fish, mollusks, and certain other water-dwelling animals which reproduce by spraying this fluid, which contains the sperm, onto roe (fish eggs). It can also refer to the sperm sacs or testes that contain the semen.

Milt as food
Milt or soft roe also refers to the male genitalia of fish when they contain sperm, used as food. Many cultures eat milt, often fried, though not usually as a dish by itself.

In Indonesian cuisine, the milt (called telur ikan; fish egg) of snakehead and snapper is usually made into kari or woku.

In Japanese cuisine, the testes (白子 shirako 'white children') of cod (tara),  anglerfish (ankō), salmon (sake), squid (ika) and pufferfish (fugu) are eaten.

In Korean cuisine, the milt ( iri) of Alaska pollock, cod, blackmouth angler, bogeo, and sea bream are eaten.

In Romanian cuisine, the milt of carp and other fresh water fish is called "Lapți" (from the Latin word lactes) and is usually fried.

In Russian cuisine, herring milt (молока, "Moloka") is pickled the same way as the rest of the fish, but eaten separately, sometimes combined with pickled herring roe. Various whitefish soft roes are usually consumed fried and it is an inexpensive everyday dish.

In Sicilian cuisine, the milt of tuna is called "Lattume" and is used as a typical pasta topping.

In British cuisine, soft cod roes are a traditional dish, usually fried in butter and spread on toast.

See also

 List of delicacies

References
 

Reproduction in animals
Fish products
Semen